Brownlie is a surname. Notable people with the surname include:

 Cyril Brownlie (1895–1954), New Zealand rugby union footballer
 Dean Brownlie (21st century), Australian born, New Zealand cricketer
 Emma Brownlie (born 1993), Scottish footballer
 Ian Brownlie (21st century), British jurist
 Ira C. Brownlie (19th century), American football coach
 Jimmy Brownlie (1885–1973), Scottish footballer with Third Lanark and Scotland
 John Brownlie (born 1952), Scottish footballer with Hibernian, Newcastle and Scotland
 Maurice Brownlie (1897–1957), New Zealand rugby union footballer
 Royce Brownlie (born 1980), Australian football player
 Willie Brownlie (1882–1943), Scottish footballer with Hamilton, Toronto Scottish, Robins Dry Dock

See also
 Brownlee (surname)
 Julia Brownley, American politician